Nowa Wieś Człuchowska  is a village in the administrative district of Gmina Przechlewo, within Człuchów County, Pomeranian Voivodeship, in northern Poland. It is located within the ethnocultural region of Kashubia in the historic region of Pomerania.

The village has a population of 428.

Nowa Wieś Człuchowska was a royal village of the Polish Crown, administratively located in the Człuchów County in the Pomeranian Voivodeship.

References

Villages in Człuchów County